The Shooting Range is a compilation album by American rapper Messy Marv, released on August 2010, via Clickclack Records. The first of the Shooting Range series, the album features guest appearances from D.O.E., Young Doe, Glasses Malone and The Jacka, among others. It peaked on the Top R&B/Hip-Hop Albums chart at No. 85.

Track listing

References

External links
http://www.allmusic.com/album/shooting-range-mw0001970079

2010 albums
Messy Marv albums